Granada is a department in Nicaragua. It covers an area of 1040 km2 and has a population of 215,965 (2021 estimate). The capital is the city of Granada, one of North America's oldest cities.

Municipalities 

 Diria
 Diriomo
 Granada
 Nandaime

References 

 
Departments of Nicaragua